San Vicente is a district of the Moravia canton, in the San José province of Costa Rica.

Geography 
San Vicente has an area of  km² and an elevation of  metres.

Locations 
The district of San Vicente comprises the city of the same name and the following neighborhoods (by 2009): Alondra, Americano, Américas, Bajo Isla, Bajo Varelas, Barro de Olla, Caragua, Carmen, Colegios, Colegios Norte, Chaves, El Alto (part of), Flor, Florencia, Guaria, Guaria Oriental, Isla, Jardines de Moravia, La Casa, Ladrillera, Robles, Romeral, Sagrado Corazón, San Blas, San Jorge, San Martín, San Rafael, Santa Clara (part of), Santo Tomás and Saprissa.

Education and Culture

The Escuela Japonesa de San José is the only Japanese international school in Costa Rica, and located in San Vicente.

Demographics 

For the 2011 census, San Vicente had a population of  inhabitants.

Transportation

Road transportation 
The district is covered by the following road routes:
 National Route 102
 National Route 109
 National Route 117
 National Route 200

References 

Districts of San José Province
Populated places in San José Province